Guido Pella was the defending champion but chose not to defend his title.

Diego Schwartzman won the title after defeating Rogério Dutra Silva 6–4, 6–1 in the final.

Seeds

Draw

Finals

Top half

Bottom half

References
Main Draw
Qualifying Draw

Uruguay Open - Singles